Look Up and Live was a 30-minute television anthology series. The series was produced in cooperation with the National Council of Churches and aired on CBS from January 3, 1954 to January 21, 1979. It was a non-denominational Sunday morning religious show that covered issues from multiple perspectives, avoiding heavy proselytizing. The series' success in reaching young people with inspirational messages was due partially to the contemporary musicians and celebrities featured on the show.

In 1960, Look Up and Live received the Peabody Award. At that time, Reverend Andrew Young was a host of the series. Young, who would later become a top aide to Martin Luther King, Jr., was associate director of the Department of Youth Work for the National Council of Churches from 1957 to 1960. His duties included working on Look Up and Live, both in front of and behind the camera. Young has said that the knowledge of television he gained during his time working on the series enabled him to advise Dr. King on media strategy.

There were a number of other narrators and hosts over the years, including Mahalia Jackson, Merv Griffin, Eddie Fisher, Eydie Gormé, and Ed Sullivan. Guest stars included Gene Hackman, Oscar Brown, Dick Van Dyke, James Earl Jones, Bennye Gatteys, Jack Klugman, Sal Mineo, Billy Dee Williams, Theodore Bikel, Ossie Davis, Ruby Dee, and, in two of his earliest performances, Warren Beatty. John M. Gunn edited six plays that were turned into episodes of the show.

In 1979, Look Up and Live and Lamp Unto My Feet, both of which were cancelled earlier that year, along with Camera Three, to make room for CBS News Sunday Morning, were combined into a new series called For Our Times, a weekly religious talk show which aired until 1988.

Some episodes of Look Up and Live are preserved at the Paley Center for Media in New York City and in the Peabody Awards archive at the University of Georgia.

References

External links

1950s American anthology television series
1960s American anthology television series
1970s American anthology television series
1954 American television series debuts
1979 American television series endings
American religious television series
Black-and-white American television shows
CBS original programming
Peabody Award-winning television programs